A snow angel is a design, made in fresh snow, by lying on one's back and moving one's arms up and down, and one's legs from side to side, to form the shape of an angel.

Technique 
The creation of the snow angel is a simple process. The first step is to find an undisturbed plane of fresh snow. The next step is to lie with arms and legs outstretched, on the snow. The limbs are then swept back and forth, creating a trough through the snow. When it is finished, the snow angel should have the appearance of a stylized angel, the movement of the arms having formed wings, and that of the legs having formed a gown. Fresh, light, powdery snow makes the best snow angel rather than heavy, sticky snow.

Current world record 
On March 28, 2007, Guinness World Records confirmed that North Dakota holds the world record for the most snow angels made simultaneously in one place. The event occurred on February 17, 2007, when 8,962 snow angels were created by people on the state capitol grounds in Bismarck.

Previously, the record was held by Michigan Technological University with 3,784 students, locals, and alumni making snow angels on the school football field.

Non-human snow angels 

Some birds (e.g. pheasants) leave on the snow a figure similar to a snow angel. Weddell seals often leave outlines of themselves, similar to a snow angel, melted into the ice; additionally, these seals can thumb their nose at the cold, leaving images called seal shadows.

In popular culture
 Engler i sneen / Angels in the Snow. Norwegian 1989 hit with Jonas Fjeld and Lynni Treekrem.  Melody: Jonas Fjeld. Lyrics: Ole Paus, English translation: Eric Anderson.
 In an episode of The Simpsons entitled "Skinner's Sense of Snow", Homer Simpson creates a snow angel, that then turns into a snow devil.

References

External links

Buildings and structures made of snow or ice
Play (activity)
Angels in popular culture